Constantine IV (Konstantine IV Mukhranbatoni; , Konstantin Ivanovich Bagration-Mukhransky) (1782 – 7 September 1842) was the head of the Mukhrani branch of the Bagrationi dynasty of Georgia  and the last Prince (batoni) of Mukhrani and ex officio commander of the Banner of Shida Kartli and Grand Master of the Household (msakhurt-ukhutsesi) of Georgia in 1801. Afterwards, he was in the service of the Russian Empire, ending his career with the rank of general.

Biography  
Constantine was the eldest son of Ioane I, Prince of Mukhrani, and Princess Ketevan of Georgia, daughter of King Heraclius II of Georgia. He succeeded to the headship of the House of Mukhrani on the death of his father in October 1801. In the last years of the Georgian monarchy, he was among those dignitaries who saw Georgia's future within the Russian realm and opposed accession of Prince David, son of the ailing King George XII, to the throne of Georgia. When Georgia was annexed by Russia in 1801, the status of Mukhrani as a sovereign feudatory was revoked and the nobility of Georgia was integrated with that of Russia. Constantine's loyalty to the new regime was rewarded with the rank of colonel in 1808 and of major-general in 1817. In 1830, he was elected as the first Marshal of Nobility of the Tiflis Governorate, a move opposed by the general and poet Prince Alexander Chavchavadze. He retired from military service in 1838 with the right to a rank of lieutenant-general.

Family  
Constantine IV married Princess Khoreshan Guramishvili (1786–1831) and had 7 children: 
Ivane Bagration of Mukhrani (1812–1895)
Irakli Bagration of Mukhrani (1813–1892)
Alexander Bagration of Mukhrani (1817–1851)
Giorgi Bagration of Mukhrani (1820–1874)
Ekaterine Bagration of Mukhrani (born 1825)
Mariam Bagration of Mukhrani (born 1826)
Mikheil Bagration of Mukhrani (1831–1907)
 Alexander (1856-1935), chamberlain
 Konstantine Bagration of Mukhrani (1889–1915).

References

1782 births
1842 deaths
House of Mukhrani
Imperial Russian Army generals
Georgian generals in the Imperial Russian Army
Georgian major generals (Imperial Russia)